The province of the West Java in Indonesia is divided into regencies and cities, which in turn are divided administratively into districts, known as kecamatan.

The districts of West Java with the regency it falls into are as follows:

Agrabinta, Cianjur
Andir, Bandung
Anjatan, Indramayu
Antapani, Bandung
Arahan, Indramayu
Arcamanik, Bandung
Argapura, Majalengka
Arjasari, Bandung
Arjawinangun, Cirebon
Astanaanyar, Bandung
Astanajapura, Cirebon
Babakan Madang, Bogor
Babakan, Cirebon
Babakancikao, Purwakarta
Babakanciparay, Bandung
Babelan, Bekasi
Baleendah, Bandung
Balongan, Indramayu
Balubur Limbangan, Garut
Bandung Kidul, Bandung
Bandung Kulon, Bandung
Bandung Wetan, Bandung
Bangodua, Indramayu
Banjar, Banjar
Banjaran, Bandung
Banjaran, Majalengka
Banjarsari, Ciamis
Banjarwangi, Garut
Bantar Gebang, Bekasi
Bantargadung, Sukabumi
Bantarkalong, Tasikmalaya
Bantarujeg, Majalengka
Banyuresmi, Garut
Banyusari, Karawang
Baros, Sukabumi
Batujajar, Bandung Barat
Batujaya, Karawang
Batununggal, Bandung
Bayongbong, Garut
Beber, Cirebon
Beji, Depok
Bekasi Barat, Bekasi
Bekasi Selatan, Bekasi
Bekasi Timur, Bekasi
Bekasi Utara, Bekasi
Binong, Subang
Blanakan, Subang
Bogor Barat, Bogor
Bogor Selatan, Bogor
Bogor Tengah, Bogor
Bogor Timur, Bogor
Bogor Utara, Bogor
Bojong Asih, Tasikmalaya
Bojong Genteng, Sukabumi
Bojong, Purwakarta
Bojonggambir, Tasikmalaya
Bojonggede, Bogor
Bojongloa Kaler, Bandung
Bojongloa Kidul, Bandung
Bojongmanggu, Bekasi
Bojongpicung, Cianjur
Bojongsoang, Bandung
Bongas, Indramayu
Buahdua, Sumedang
Bungbulang, Garut
Bungursari, Purwakarta
Cabangbungin, Bekasi
Campaka Mulya, Cianjur
Campaka, Cianjur
Campaka, Purwakarta
Cangkuang, Bandung
Cantigi, Indramayu
Caringin, Bogor
Caringin, Garut
Caringin, Sukabumi
Cariu, Bogor
Ciamis, Ciamis
Ciampea, Bogor
Ciampel, Karawang
Cianjur, Cianjur
Ciasem, Subang
Ciawi, Bogor
Ciawi, Tasikmalaya
Ciawigebang, Kuningan
Cibadak, Sukabumi
Cibalong, Garut
Cibalong, Tasikmalaya
Cibarusah, Bekasi
Cibatu, Garut
Cibatu, Purwakarta
Cibeber, Cianjur
Cibeunying Kaler, Bandung
Cibeunying Kidul, Bandung
Cibeureum, Kuningan
Cibeureum, Sukabumi
Cibeureum, Tasikmalaya
Cibingbin, Kuningan
Cibinong, Bogor
Cibinong, Cianjur
Cibiru, Bandung
Cibitung, Bekasi
Cibitung, Sukabumi
Cibiuk, Garut
Cibogo, Subang
Cibuaya, Karawang
Cibugel, Sumedang
Cibungbulang, Bogor
Cicalengka, Bandung
Cicantayan, Sukabumi
Cicendo, Bandung
Cicurug, Sukabumi
Cidadap, Bandung
Cidadap, Sukabumi
Cidahu, Kuningan
Cidahu, Sukabumi
Cidaun, Cianjur
Cidolog, Ciamis
Cidolog, Sukabumi
Ciemas, Sukabumi
Cigalontang, Tasikmalaya
Cigandamekar, Kuningan
Cigasong, Majalengka
Cigedug, Garut
Cigombong, Bogor
Cigudeg, Bogor
Cigugur, Ciamis
Cigugur, Kuningan
Cihampelas, Bandung Barat
Cihaurbeuti, Ciamis
Cihideung, Tasikmalaya
Cihurip, Garut
Cijambe, Subang
Cijati, Cianjur
Cijeruk, Bogor
Cijeungjing, Ciamis
Cijulang, Ciamis
Cikadu, Cianjur
Cikajang, Garut
Cikakak, Sukabumi
Cikalong Wetan, Bandung Barat
Cikalong, Tasikmalaya
Cikalongkulon, Cianjur
Cikampek, Karawang
Cikancung, Bandung
Cikarang Barat, Bekasi
Cikarang Pusat, Bekasi
Cikarang Selatan, Bekasi
Cikarang Timur, Bekasi
Cikarang Utara, Bekasi
Cikatomas, Tasikmalaya
Cikaum, Subang
Cikedung, Indramayu
Cikelet, Garut
Cikembar, Sukabumi
Cikidang, Sukabumi
Cikijing, Majalengka
Cikole, Sukabumi
Cikoneng, Ciamis
Cilaku, Cianjur
Cilamaya Kulon, Karawang
Cilamaya Wetan, Karawang
Cilawu, Garut
Cilebak, Kuningan
Cilebar, Karawang
Ciledug, Cirebon
Cilengkrang, Bandung
Cileungsi, Bogor
Cileunyi, Bandung
Cililin, Bandung Barat
Cilimus, Kuningan
Cimahi Selatan, Cimahi
Cimahi Tengah, Cimahi
Cimahi Utara, Cimahi
Cimahi, Kuningan
Cimalaka, Sumedang
Cimanggis, Depok
Cimanggu, Sumedang
Cimaragas, Ciamis
Cimaung, Bandung
Cimenyan, Bandung
Cimerak, Ciamis
Cineam, Tasikmalaya
Cingambul, Majalengka
Ciniru, Kuningan
Ciomas, Bogor
Cipaku, Ciamis
Cipanas, Cianjur
Ciparay, Bandung
Cipatat, Bandung Barat
Cipatujah, Tasikmalaya
Cipedes, Tasikmalaya
Cipeundeuy, Bandung Barat
Cipeundeuy, Subang
Cipicung, Kuningan
Cipongkor, Bandung Barat
Cipunagara, Subang
Ciracap, Sukabumi
Ciranjang, Cianjur
Cirebon Selatan, Cirebon
Cirebon Utara, Cirebon 
Cireunghas, Sukabumi
Cisaat, Sukabumi
Cisaga, Ciamis
Cisalak, Subang
Cisarua, Bandung Barat
Cisarua, Bogor
Cisarua, Sumedang
Cisayong, Tasikmalaya
Ciseeng, Bogor
Cisewu, Garut
Cisitu, Sumedang
Cisolok, Sukabumi
Cisompet, Garut
Cisurupan, Garut
Citamiang, Sukabumi
Citeureup, Bogor
Ciwaringin, Cirebon
Ciwaru, Kuningan
Ciwidey, Bandung
Coblong, Bandung
Compreng, Subang
Conggeang, Sumedang
Cugenang, Cianjur
Culamega, Tasikmalaya
Curugkembar, Sukabumi
Darangdan, Purwakarta
Darma, Kuningan
Darmaraja, Sumedang
Dawuan, Majalengka
Dawuan, Subang Regency
Dayeuhkolot, Bandung
Depok, Cirebon
Dramaga, Bogor
Dukupuntang, Cirebon
Gabuswetan, Indramayu
Ganeas, Sumedang
Gantar, Indramayu
Garawangi, Kuningan
Garut Kota, Garut
Gebang, Cirebon
Gegerbitung, Sukabumi
Gegesik, Cirebon
Gekbrong, Cianjur
Gempol, Cirebon
Gunung Guruh, Sukabumi
Gunung Putri, Bogor
Gunung Sindur, Bogor
Gununghalu, Bandung Barat
Gunungpuyuh, Sukabumi
Gunungtanjung, Tasikmalaya
Hantara, Kuningan
Harjamukti, Cirebon
Haurgeulis, Indramayu
Haurwangi, Cianjur
Ibun, Bandung
Indihiang, Tasikmalaya
Indramayu, Indramayu
Jalaksana, Kuningan
Jalan Cagak, Subang
Jamanis, Tasikmalaya
Jampang Kulon, Sukabumi
Jampang Tengah, Sukabumi
Japara, Kuningan
Jasinga, Bogor
Jati Asih, Bekasi
Jati Sampurna, Bekasi
Jatibarang, Indramayu
Jatigede, Sumedang
Jatiluhur, Purwakarta
Jatinagara, Ciamis
Jatinangor, Sumedang
Jatinunggal, Sumedang
Jatisari, Karawang
Jatitujuh, Majalengka
Jatiwangi, Majalengka
Jatiwaras, Tasikmalaya
Jayakerta, Karawang
Juntinyuat, Indramayu
Kabandungan, Sukabumi
Kadipaten, Majalengka
Kadipaten, Tasikmalaya
Kadudampit, Sukabumi
Kadugede, Kuningan
Kadungora, Garut
Kadupandak, Cianjur
Kalapa Nunggal, Sukabumi
Kalibunder, Sukabumi
Kalijati, Subang
Kalimanggis, Kuningan
Kalipucang, Ciamis
Kaliwedi, Cirebon
Kandanghaur, Indramayu
Kapetakan, Cirebon
Karang Jaya, Tasikmalaya
Karangampel, Indramayu
Karangbahagia, Bekasi
Karangkancana, Kuningan
Karangnunggal, Tasikmalaya
Karangpawitan, Garut
Karangsembung, Cirebon
Karangtengah, Cianjur
Karangtengah, Garut
Karangwareng, Cirebon
Karawang Barat, Karawang
Karawang Timur, Karawang
Karawang, Karawang
Katapang, Bandung
Kawali, Ciamis
Kawalu, Tasikmalaya
Kebonpedes, Sukabumi
Kedawung, Cirebon
Kedokan Bunder, Indramayu
Kedungwaringin, Bekasi
Kejaksan, Cirebon
Kemang, Bogor
Kersamanah, Garut
Kertajati, Majalengka
Kertasari, Bandung
Kertasemaya, Indramayu
Kesambi, Cirebon
Kiaracondong, Bandung
Kiarapedes, Purwakarta
Klangenan, Cirebon
Klapanunggal, Bogor
Klari, Karawang
Kotabaru, Karawang
Kramatmulya, Kuningan
Krangkeng, Indramayu
Kroya, Indramayu
Kuningan, Kuningan
Kutawaluya, Karawang
Kutawaringin, Bandung
Lakbok, Ciamis
Langensari, Banjar
Langkaplancar, Ciamis
Lebakwangi, Kuningan
Legon Kulon, Subang
Lelea, Indramayu
Leles, Cianjur
Leles, Garut
Lemahabang, Cirebon
Lemahabang, Karawang
Lemahsugih, Majalengka
Lemahwungkuk, Cirebon
Lembang, Bandung Barat
Lembursitu, Sukabumi
Lengkong, Bandung
Lengkong, Sukabumi
Leuwigoong, Garut
Leuwiliang, Bogor
Leuwimunding, Majalengka
Leuwisadeng, Bogor
Leuwisari, Tasikmalaya
Ligung, Majalengka
Limo, Depok
Lohbener, Indramayu
Losarang, Indramayu
Losari, Cirebon
Luragung, Kuningan
Maja, Majalengka
Majalaya, Bandung
Majalaya, Karawang
Majalengka, Majalengka
Malangbong, Garut
Maleber, Kuningan
Mande, Cianjur
Mandirancan, Kuningan
Mangkubumi, Tasikmalaya
Mangunreja, Tasikmalaya
Maniis, Purwakarta
Manonjaya, Tasikmalaya
Margaasih, Bandung
Margacinta, Bandung
Margahayu, Bandung
Medan Satria, Bekasi
Megamendung, Bogor
Mekarmukti, Garut
Muara Gembong, Bekasi
Mundu, Cirebon
Mustika Jaya, Bekasi
Nagrak, Sukabumi
Nagreg, Bandung
Nanggung, Bogor
Naringgul, Cianjur
Ngamprah, Bandung Barat
Nusaherang, Kuningan
Nyalindung, Sukabumi
Pabedilan, Cirebon
Pabuaran, Cirebon
Pabuaran, Subang
Pabuaran, Sukabumi
Pacet, Bandung
Pacet, Cianjur
Padaherang, Ciamis
Padakembang, Tasikmalaya
Padalarang, Bandung Barat
Pagaden, Subang
Pagelaran, Cianjur
Pagerageung, Tasikmalaya
Pakenjeng, Garut
Pakisjaya, Karawang
Palasah, Majalengka
Palimanan, Cirebon
Pamanukan, Subang
Pamarican, Ciamis
Pameungpeuk, Bandung
Pameungpeuk, Garut
Pamijahan, Bogor
Pamulihan, Garut
Pamulihan, Sumedang
Panawangan, Ciamis
Pancalang, Kuningan
Pancatengah, Tasikmalaya
Pancoran Mas, Depok
Pangalengan, Bandung
Pangandaran, Ciamis
Pangatikan, Garut
Pangenan, Cirebon
Pangkalan, Karawang
Panguragan, Cirebon
Panjalu, Ciamis
Panumbangan, Ciamis
Panyingkiran, Majalengka
Parakan Salak, Sukabumi
Parigi, Ciamis
Parongpong, Bandung Barat
Parung Kuda, Sukabumi
Parung Panjang, Bogor
Parung, Bogor
Parungponteng, Tasikmalaya
Pasaleman, Cirebon
Pasawahan, Kuningan
Pasawahan, Purwakarta
Paseh, Bandung
Paseh, Sumedang
Pasirjambu, Bandung
Pasirkuda, Cianjur
Pasirwangi, Garut
Pataruman, Banjar
Patok Beusi, Subang
Pebayuran, Bekasi
Pedes, Karawang
Pekalipan, Cirebon
Pelabuhan Ratu, Sukabumi
Peundeuy, Garut
Plered, Cirebon
Plered, Purwakarta
Plumbon, Cirebon
Pondok Gede, Bekasi
Pondok Melati, Bekasi
Pondoksalam, Purwakarta
Purabaya, Sukabumi
Purwadadi, Subang
Purwaharja, Banjar
Purwakarta, Purwakarta
Purwasari, Karawang
Pusakanagara, Subang
Puspahiang, Tasikmalaya
Rajadesa, Ciamis
Rajagaluh, Majalengka
Rajapolah, Tasikmalaya
Ranca Bungur, Bogor
Rancabali, Bandung
Rancaekek, Bandung
Rancah, Ciamis
Rancakalong, Sumedang
Rancasari, Bandung
Rawa Lumbu, Bekasi
Rawamerta, Karawang
Regol, Bandung
Rengasdengklok, Karawang
Rongga, Bandung Barat
Rumpin, Bogor
Sadananya, Ciamis
Sagalaherang, Subang
Sagaranten, Sukabumi
Salawu, Tasikmalaya
Salopa, Tasikmalaya
Samarang, Garut
Sariwangi, Tasikmalaya
Sawangan, Depok
Sedong, Cirebon
Selaawi, Garut
Selajambe, Kuningan
Serang Baru, Bekasi
Setu, Bekasi
Sidamulih, Ciamis
Simpenan, Sukabumi
Sindang, Indramayu
Sindangagung, Kuningan
Sindangbarang, Cianjur
Sindangkerta, Bandung Barat
Sindangwangi, Majalengka
Singajaya, Garut
Singaparna, Tasikmalaya
Situraja, Sumedang
Sliyeg, Indramayu
Sodonghilir, Tasikmalaya
Solokan Jeruk, Bandung
Soreang, Bandung
Subang, Kuningan
Subang, Subang
Sucinaraja, Garut
Sukabumi, Sukabumi
Sukadana, Ciamis
Sukagumiwang, Indramayu
Sukahaji, Majalengka
Sukahening, Tasikmalaya
Sukajadi, Bandung
Sukajaya, Bogor
Sukakarya, Bekasi
Sukalarang, Sukabumi
Sukaluyu, Cianjur
Sukamakmur, Bogor
Sukanagara, Cianjur
Sukaraja, Bogor
Sukaraja, Sukabumi
Sukaraja, Tasikmalaya
Sukarame, Tasikmalaya
Sukaratu, Tasikmalaya
Sukaresik, Tasikmalaya
Sukaresmi, Cianjur
Sukaresmi, Garut
Sukasari, Bandung
Sukasari, Purwakarta
Sukasari, Sumedang
Sukatani, Bekasi
Sukatani, Purwakarta
Sukawangi, Bekasi
Sukawening, Garut
Sukmajaya, Depok
Sukra, Indramayu
Sumber, Cirebon
Sumberjaya, Majalengka
Sumedang Selatan, Sumedang
Sumedang Utara, Sumedang
Sumurbandung, Bandung
Surade, Sukabumi
Surian, Sumedang
Susukan, Cirebon
Susukanlebak, Cirebon
Tajur Halang, Bogor
Takokak, Cianjur
Talaga, Majalengka
Talagasari, Karawang
Talegong, Garut
Tamansari, Bogor
Tamansari, Tasikmalaya
Tambaksari, Ciamis
Tambelang, Bekasi
Tambun Selatan, Bekasi
Tambun Utara, Bekasi
Tanah Sareal, Bogor
Tanggeung, Cianjur
Tanjung Siang, Subang
Tanjungjaya, Tasikmalaya
Tanjungkerta, Sumedang
Tanjungmedar, Sumedang
Tanjungsari, Bogor
Tanjungsari, Sumedang
Taraju, Tasikmalaya
Tarogong Kaler, Garut
Tarogong Kidul, Garut
Tarumajaya, Bekasi
Tawang, Tasikmalaya
Tegal Buleud, Sukabumi
Tegalwaru, Karawang
Tegalwaru, Purwakarta
Telukjambe Barat, Karawang
Telukjambe Timur, Karawang
Telukjambe, Karawang
Tempuran, Karawang
Tengah Tani, Cirebon
Tenjo, Bogor
Tenjolaya, Bogor
Tirtajaya, Karawang
Tirtamulya, Karawang
Tomo, Sumedang
Trisi, Indramayu
Tukdana, Indramayu
Ujung Jaya, Sumedang
Ujungberung, Bandung
Wado, Sumedang
Waled, Cirebon
Waluran, Sukabumi
Wanaraja, Garut
Wanayasa, Purwakarta
Warudoyong, Sukabumi
Warung Kiara, Sukabumi
Warungkondang, Cianjur
Weru, Cirebon
Widasari, Indramayu

 
West Java